Anthology is a compilation album by American indie rock/emo band Christie Front Drive. The album was released in 1995 by Caulfield Records. It is a compilation of the band's first 12" and 7" releases up to 1995, however excluding the three songs from their split EP with Boys Life.

Track listing
"Turn" – 4:03
"Dyed on 8" – 5:05
"Long Out" – 4:28
"Lot" – 5:33
"Pipe" – 5:27
"Dirt" – 3:54
"Slide" – 5:20
"Now I Do" – 4:10
"4010" – 5:02
"Away" – 3:55

Personnel
Eric Richter – vocals, guitar
Jason Begin – guitar, screams on "Long Out" and "Away"
Kerry McDonald – bass, vocals
Ron Marschall – drums

References

1995 compilation albums
Christie Front Drive albums